Gerard Heinrich Veringa (13 April 1924 – 29 December 1999) was a Dutch politician of the defunct Catholic People's Party (KVP) now merged into the Christian Democratic Appeal (CDA) party and criminologist.

Veringa attended a Gymnasium in Groningen from April 1936 until May 1942 and applied at the University of Groningen in June 1945 majoring in Law and obtaining a Bachelor of Laws degree in June 1946 before switching to Criminology and Political science and transferring to the Fordham University in New York City in July 1946 before graduating with a Master of Criminal Justice degree and an Master of Social Science degree September 1947 and worked as a researcher at the Fordham University before he got an doctorate as an Doctor of Philosophy in Criminology in August 1949. Veringa worked as a civics teacher at Manhattan College in New York City from September 1948 until December 1949 and worked as a researcher at the University of Groningen from December 1949 until February 1952. Veringa worked as a civil servant for the Custodial Institutions Agency of the Ministry of Justice from February 1952 until January 1964 as a prison administrator in Zutphen from February 1952 until October 1955 and a prison administrator in The Hague from October 1955 until March 1962. Veringa served on the Municipal Council of Rijswijk from September 1958 until April 1967. Veringa also worked as a legal advisor for the Ministry of Justice from November 1959 until April 1967 and served as Director-General of the Custodial Institutions Agency from October 1961 until January 1964. Veringa worked as an associate professor of Criminology at the Radboud University Nijmegen from 1 January 1964 until 1 September 1965 and as a professor of Criminal law and Criminology at the Radboud University Nijmegen from 1 September 1965 until 5 April 1967.

After the election of 1967 Veringa was appointed as Minister of Education and Sciences in the Cabinet De Jong, taking office on 5 April 1967. Veringa served as acting Minister of Culture, Recreation and Social Work from 7 January 1971 until 22 February 1971 during a medical leave of absence of Marga Klompé. After the Leader of the Catholic People's Party and Parliamentary leader of the Catholic People's Party in the House of Representatives Norbert Schmelzer unexpectedly announced that he was stepping down as Leader and Parliamentary leader in the House of Representatives, the Catholic People's Party leadership approached Veringa as a candidate to succeed him, Veringa accepted and became the Leader of the Catholic People's Party and became the Lijsttrekker (top candidate) of the Catholic People's Party for the election of 1971, taking office on 25 February 1971. The Catholic People's Party suffered a loss, losing 7 seats and fell back as the second largest party and now had 35 seats in the House of Representatives. Veringa was subsequently elected as a Member of the House of Representatives and as Parliamentary leader in the House of Representatives, taking office on 11 May 1971. The following cabinet formation of 1971 resulted in a coalition agreement between the Catholic People's Party, the People's Party for Freedom and Democracy (VVD), the Anti-Revolutionary Party (ARP, the Christian Historical Union (CHU) and the Democratic Socialists '70 (DS'70) which formed the Cabinet Biesheuvel I with Veringa opting to remain in the House of Representatives instead of accepting a cabinet post in the new cabinet and he continued to serve in the House of Representatives as Parliamentary leader, the Cabinet De Jong was replaced by the new cabinet on 6 July 1971. On 16 August 1971 Veringa took a temporary medical leave of absence as Parliamentary leader but on 28 September 1971 Veringa unexpectedly announced that he was stepping down as Leader permanently but continued to serve in the House of Representatives as a backbencher.

In January 1972 Veringa was nominated as Member of the Council of State, he resigned as a Member of the House of Representatives the same day he was installed as a Member of the Council of State, serving from 1 February 1972 until 1 May 1994. Veringa also became active in the public sector and occupied numerous seats as a nonprofit director on several boards of directors and supervisory boards and served on several state commissions and councils on behalf of the government (Council for Culture, Public Pension Funds APB, Cadastre Agency and the Probation Agency).

Veringa was known for his abilities as a negotiator and consensus builder. Veringa continued to comment on political affairs until his is death at the age of 75.

Decorations

References

External links

Official
  Dr. G.H. (Gerard) Veringa Parlement & Politiek

 

 

 
 

 

 
 

1924 births
1999 deaths
Catholic People's Party politicians
Christian Democratic Appeal politicians
Commanders of the Order of Isabella the Catholic
Commanders of the Order of the Netherlands Lion
Criminology educators
Dutch criminologists
Dutch legal scholars
Dutch expatriates in the United States
Dutch nonprofit directors
Dutch prison administrators
Dutch Roman Catholics
Dutch sociologists
Fordham University alumni
Grand Officers of the Order of Leopold II
Grand Officers of the Order of Orange-Nassau
Grand Officiers of the Légion d'honneur
Knights Commander of the Order of Merit of the Federal Republic of Germany
Knights of St. Gregory the Great
Knights of the Holy Sepulchre
Leaders of the Catholic People's Party
Manhattan College faculty
Ministers of Education of the Netherlands
Ministers of Social Work of the Netherlands
Ministers of Sport of the Netherlands
Members of the Council of State (Netherlands)
Members of the House of Representatives (Netherlands)
Municipal councillors in South Holland
Politicians from Groningen (city)
People from Rijswijk
Academic staff of Radboud University Nijmegen
Scholars of criminal law
University of Groningen alumni
Academic staff of the University of Groningen
20th-century Dutch civil servants
20th-century Dutch educators
20th-century Dutch jurists
20th-century Dutch politicians
20th-century Dutch scientists